James Madison Middle School located in the Franklin-Colonial neighborhood of Roanoke, Virginia, USA, is situated on a large hill with a view of the Blue Ridge Mountains. Opened in 1970, it is a magnet school for technology and is part of the Roanoke City Public Schools. The school's athletics teams are the Matadors.

Notable achievements
The school has competed in the Virginia Mathematics 6th Grade League with the following notable results:
 1998-99 - 5th out of 183 schools
 2000-01 - 6th out of 141 Schools
 2002-03 - 5th out of 108 schools

In the international Odyssey of the Mind competition in 2001, James Madison Middle School won through to represent the US and placed 3rd out of a field of 57 teams representing the United States.

James Madison has a notable chess team that in 2005 were runners up in the Virginia State K-8 Team Championships, losing by half a point.

References

External links 
 Official site

Public middle schools in Virginia
Educational institutions established in 1970
Schools in Roanoke, Virginia
Magnet schools in Virginia